William "Bill" Ambrose Carow (June 9, 1924 – November 24, 2011) was an American speed skater who competed in the 1956 Winter Olympics and in the 1960 Winter Olympics. He was born in Duluth, Minnesota and died in Verona, Wisconsin.

In 1956 he finished sixth in the 500 metres event. Four years later he also competed in the 500 metres competition but did not finish the race.

External links
Bill Carow's profile at Sports Reference.com
Bill Carow's obituary

1924 births
2011 deaths
American male speed skaters
Olympic speed skaters of the United States
Speed skaters at the 1956 Winter Olympics
Speed skaters at the 1960 Winter Olympics
Recipients of the Distinguished Flying Cross (United States)
People from Duluth, Minnesota